Communicate, released on 12 October 2001, is the second album by New Zealand rock band The Feelers. Singles include "Communicate", "As Good As It Gets", "Astronaut", "Fishing for Lisa", "The Web" and "Anniversary". It has sold over twice platinum on the New Zealand music charts.

Track listing

2001 albums
The Feelers albums